De Noche is the fourth studio album by Mexican singer María José. It is her first album since her debut album to feature original content; her previous two albums were cover albums of songs from the 80's era. Preceded by the release of its lead single "Tú Ya Sabes A Mi", De Noche was met with positive reviews from both music critics and fans.

Three official singles were released from the album while three more were released only for Spain. "Tu Ya Sabes a Mi" marked the first time since "¿Dónde está?" since she released an original song. "Extraña" followed as the second single in Spain while "El Amor Manda" was chosen for the rest of Latin America and also served as the opening theme for the Mexican soap opera of the same name. Furthermore, the third and final single "Prefiero Ser Su Amante" was composed by fellow Mexican singer Paty Cantú, while "La Cara Oculta Del Amor" and "Ahora o Nunca" were the third and fourth singles released in Spain.

Track listing

Charts and sales 
The album debuted on the Mexican Albums Chart the album debuted at number 3, and on the Mexican International Albums Chart at number 2.

Charts

Certifications

References

María José (singer) albums
2012 albums